In geography, latitude is a coordinate that specifies the north–south position of a point on the surface of the Earth or another celestial body. Latitude is given as an angle that ranges from –90° at the south pole to 90° at the north pole, with 0° at the Equator. Lines of constant latitude, or parallels, run east–west as circles parallel to the equator. Latitude and longitude are used together as a coordinate pair to specify a location on the surface of the Earth.

On its own, the term "latitude" normally refers to the geodetic latitude as defined below. Briefly, the geodetic latitude of a point is the angle formed between the vector perpendicular (or normal) to the ellipsoidal surface from the point, and the  plane of the equator.

Background
Two levels of abstraction are employed in the definitions of latitude and longitude. In the first step the physical surface is modeled by the geoid, a surface which approximates the mean sea level over the oceans and its continuation under the land masses. The second step is to approximate the geoid by a mathematically simpler reference surface. The simplest choice for the reference surface is a sphere, but the geoid is more accurately modeled by an ellipsoid. The definitions of latitude and longitude on such reference surfaces are detailed in the following sections. Lines of constant latitude and longitude together constitute a graticule on the reference surface. The latitude of a point on the actual surface is that of the corresponding point on the reference surface, the correspondence being along the normal to the reference surface, which passes through the point on the physical surface. Latitude and longitude together with some specification of height constitute a geographic coordinate system as defined in the specification of the ISO 19111 standard.

Since there are many different reference ellipsoids, the precise latitude of a feature on the surface is not unique: this is stressed in the ISO standard which states that "without the full specification of the coordinate reference system, coordinates (that is latitude and longitude) are ambiguous at best and meaningless at worst". This is of great importance in accurate applications, such as a Global Positioning System (GPS), but in common usage, where high accuracy is not required, the reference ellipsoid is not usually stated.

In English texts, the latitude angle, defined below, is usually denoted by the Greek lower-case letter phi ( or ). It is measured in degrees, minutes and seconds or decimal degrees, north or south of the equator. For navigational purposes positions are given in degrees and decimal minutes. For instance, The Needles lighthouse is at 50°39.734′ N 001°35.500′ W.

This article relates to coordinate systems for the Earth: it may be adapted to cover the Moon, planets and other celestial objects (planetographic latitude).

For a brief history see History of latitude.

Determination

In celestial navigation, latitude is determined with the meridian altitude method.
More precise measurement of latitude requires an understanding of the gravitational field of the Earth, either to set up theodolites or to determine GPS satellite orbits. The study of the figure of the Earth together with its gravitational field is the science of geodesy.

Latitude on the sphere

The graticule on the sphere
The graticule is formed by the lines of constant latitude and constant longitude, which are constructed with reference to the rotation axis of the Earth. The primary reference points are the poles where the axis of rotation of the Earth intersects the reference surface. Planes which contain the rotation axis intersect the surface at the meridians; and the angle between any one meridian plane and that through Greenwich (the Prime Meridian) defines the longitude: meridians are lines of constant longitude. The plane through the centre of the Earth and perpendicular to the rotation axis intersects the surface at a great circle called the Equator. Planes parallel to the equatorial plane intersect the surface in circles of constant latitude; these are the parallels. The Equator has a latitude of 0°, the North Pole has a latitude of 90° North (written 90° N or +90°), and the South Pole has a latitude of 90° South (written 90° S or −90°). The latitude of an arbitrary point is the angle between the equatorial plane and the normal to the surface at that point: the normal to the surface of the sphere is along the radial vector.

The latitude, as defined in this way for the sphere, is often termed the spherical latitude, to avoid ambiguity with the geodetic latitude and the auxiliary latitudes defined in subsequent sections of this article.

Named latitudes on the Earth

Besides the equator, four other parallels are of significance:
{| class="wikitable"
| Arctic Circle || 66° 34′ (66.57°) N
|-
| Tropic of Cancer ||23° 26′ (23.43°) N
|-
| Tropic of Capricorn || 23° 26′ (23.43°) S
|-
| Antarctic Circle || 66° 34′ (66.57°) S
|}
The plane of the Earth's orbit about the Sun is called the ecliptic, and the plane perpendicular to the rotation axis of the Earth is the equatorial plane. The axis of rotation varies slowly over time and the values given here are those for the current epoch. The time variation is discussed more fully in the article on axial tilt.

The figure shows the geometry of a cross-section of the plane perpendicular to the ecliptic and through the centres of the Earth and the Sun at the December solstice when the Sun is overhead at some point of the Tropic of Capricorn. The south polar latitudes below the Antarctic Circle are in daylight, whilst the north polar latitudes above the Arctic Circle are in night. The situation is reversed at the June solstice, when the Sun is overhead at the Tropic of Cancer. Only at latitudes in between the two tropics is it possible for the Sun to be directly overhead (at the zenith).

On map projections there is no universal rule as to how meridians and parallels should appear. The examples below show the named parallels (as red lines) on the commonly used Mercator projection and the Transverse Mercator projection. On the former the parallels are horizontal and the meridians are vertical, whereas on the latter there is no exact relationship of parallels and meridians with horizontal and vertical: both are complicated curves.

Latitude on the ellipsoid

Ellipsoids

In 1687 Isaac Newton published the Philosophiæ Naturalis Principia Mathematica, in which he proved that a rotating self-gravitating fluid body in equilibrium takes the form of an oblate ellipsoid. (This article uses the term ellipsoid in preference to the older term spheroid.) Newton's result was confirmed by geodetic measurements in the 18th century. (See Meridian arc.) An oblate ellipsoid is the three-dimensional surface generated by the rotation of an ellipse about its shorter axis (minor axis). "Oblate ellipsoid of revolution" is abbreviated to 'ellipsoid' in the remainder of this article. (Ellipsoids which do not have an axis of symmetry are termed triaxial.)

Many different reference ellipsoids have been used in the history of geodesy. In pre-satellite days they were devised to give a good fit to the geoid over the limited area of a survey but, with the advent of GPS, it has become natural to use reference ellipsoids (such as WGS84) with centre at the centre of mass of the Earth and minor axis aligned to the rotation axis of the Earth. These geocentric ellipsoids are usually within  of the geoid. Since latitude is defined with respect to an ellipsoid, the position of a given point is different on each ellipsoid: one cannot exactly specify the latitude and longitude of a geographical feature without specifying the ellipsoid used. Many maps maintained by national agencies are based on older ellipsoids, so one must know how the latitude and longitude values are transformed from one ellipsoid to another. GPS handsets include software to carry out datum transformations which link WGS84 to the local reference ellipsoid with its associated grid.

The geometry of the ellipsoid

The shape of an ellipsoid of revolution is determined by the shape of the ellipse which is rotated about its minor (shorter) axis. Two parameters are required. One is invariably the equatorial radius, which is the semi-major axis, . The other parameter is usually (1) the polar radius or semi-minor axis, ; or (2) the (first) flattening, ; or (3) the eccentricity, . These parameters are not independent: they are related by

Values for a number of ellipsoids are given in Figure of the Earth. Reference ellipsoids are usually defined by the semi-major axis and the inverse flattening, . For example, the defining values for the WGS84 ellipsoid, used by all GPS devices, are
  (equatorial radius):  exactly
  (inverse flattening):  exactly
from which are derived
  (polar radius): 
  (eccentricity squared): 
This would barely be distinguishable from a 300-by-300-pixel sphere, so illustrations usually exaggerate the flattening.

Geodetic and geocentric latitudes

The graticule on the ellipsoid is constructed in exactly the same way as on the sphere. The normal at a point on the surface of an ellipsoid does not pass through the centre, except for points on the equator or at the poles, but the definition of latitude remains unchanged as the angle between the normal and the equatorial plane. The terminology for latitude must be made more precise by distinguishing:

Geodetic latitude: the angle between the normal and the equatorial plane. This is the definition assumed when the word latitude is used without qualification. The definition must be accompanied with a specification of the ellipsoid.
Geocentric latitude (also known as spherical latitude, after the 3D polar angle): the angle between the radius (from centre to the point on the surface) and the equatorial plane. (Figure below). This article uses .

Geographic latitude must be used with care, as some authors use it as a synonym for geodetic latitude whilst others use it as an alternative to the astronomical latitude.
"Latitude" (unqualified) should normally refer to the geodetic latitude.

The importance of specifying the reference datum may be illustrated by a simple example. On the reference ellipsoid for WGS84, the centre of the Eiffel Tower has a geodetic latitude of 48° 51′ 29″ N, or 48.8583° N and longitude of 2° 17′ 40″ E or 2.2944°E. The same coordinates on the datum ED50 define a point on the ground which is  distant from the tower. A web search may produce several different values for the latitude of the tower; the reference ellipsoid is rarely specified.

Meridian distance

The length of a degree of latitude depends on the figure of the Earth assumed.

Meridian distance on the sphere
On the sphere the normal passes through the centre and the latitude is
therefore equal to the angle subtended at the centre by the meridian arc from the equator to the point concerned. If the meridian distance is denoted by  then

No higher accuracy is appropriate for  since higher-precision results necessitate an ellipsoid model. With this value for  the meridian length of 1 degree of latitude on the sphere is  (60.0 nautical miles).

Meridian distance on the ellipsoid

In Meridian arc and standard texts it is shown that the distance along a meridian from latitude  to the equator is given by ( in radians)

where  is the meridional radius of curvature.

The quarter meridian distance from the equator to the pole is

The evaluation of the meridian distance integral is central to many studies in geodesy and map projection. It can be evaluated by expanding the integral by the binomial series and integrating term by term: see Meridian arc for details. The length of the meridian arc between two given latitudes is given by replacing the limits of the integral by the latitudes concerned. The length of a small meridian arc is given by

When the latitude difference is 1 degree, corresponding to  radians, the arc distance is about

The distance in metres (correct to 0.01 metre) between latitudes  − 0.5 degrees and  + 0.5 degrees on the WGS84 spheroid is

The variation of this distance with latitude (on WGS84) is shown in the table along with the length of a degree of longitude (east–west distance):

A calculator for any latitude is provided by the U.S. Government's National Geospatial-Intelligence Agency (NGA).

The following graph illustrates the variation of both a degree of latitude and a degree of longitude with latitude.

Auxiliary latitudes

There are six auxiliary latitudes that have applications to special problems in geodesy, geophysics and the theory of map projections:
 Geocentric latitude
 Parametric (or reduced) latitude
 Rectifying latitude
 Authalic latitude
 Conformal latitude
 Isometric latitude
The definitions given in this section all relate to locations on the reference ellipsoid but the first two auxiliary latitudes, like the geodetic latitude, can be extended to define a three-dimensional geographic coordinate system as discussed below. The remaining latitudes are not used in this way; they are used only as intermediate constructs in map projections of the reference ellipsoid to the plane or in calculations of geodesics on the ellipsoid. Their numerical values are not of interest. For example, no one would need to calculate the authalic latitude of the Eiffel Tower.

The expressions below give the auxiliary latitudes in terms of the geodetic latitude, the semi-major axis, and the eccentricity, . (For inverses see below.) The forms given are, apart from notational variants, those in the standard reference for map projections, namely "Map projections: a working manual" by J. P. Snyder. Derivations of these expressions may be found in Adams and online publications by Osborne and Rapp.

Geocentric latitude

The geocentric latitude is the angle between the equatorial plane and the radius from the centre to a point of interest. 

When the point is on the surface of the ellipsoid, the relation between the geocentric latitude and the geodetic latitude is:

For points not on the surface of the ellipsoid, the relationship involves additionally the ellipsoidal height h:
 

The geodetic and geocentric latitudes are equal at the equator and at the poles but at other latitudes they differ by a few minutes of arc. Taking the value of the squared eccentricity as 0.0067 (it depends on the choice of ellipsoid) the maximum difference of  may be shown to be about 11.5 minutes of arc at a geodetic latitude of approximately 45° 6′.

Parametric latitude (or reduced latitude)
 
The parametric latitude or reduced latitude, is defined by the radius drawn from the centre of the ellipsoid to that point  on the surrounding sphere (of radius ) which is the projection parallel to the Earth's axis of a point  on the ellipsoid at latitude . It was introduced by Legendre and Bessel who solved problems for geodesics on the ellipsoid by transforming them to an equivalent problem for spherical geodesics by using this smaller latitude. Bessel's notation, is also used in the current literature. The parametric latitude is related to the geodetic latitude by:

The alternative name arises from the parameterization of the equation of the ellipse describing a meridian section.

The Cartesian coordinates of the point are parameterized by

Cayley suggested the term parametric latitude because of the form of these equations.

The parametric latitude is not used in the theory of map projections. Its most important application is in the theory of ellipsoid geodesics, (Vincenty, Karney).

Rectifying latitude

The rectifying latitude, is the meridian distance scaled so that its value at the poles is equal to 90 degrees or  radians:

where the meridian distance from the equator to a latitude  is (see Meridian arc)

and the length of the meridian quadrant from the equator to the pole (the polar distance) is

Using the rectifying latitude to define a latitude on a sphere of radius

defines a projection from the ellipsoid to the sphere such that all meridians have true length and uniform scale. The sphere may then be projected to the plane with an equirectangular projection to give a double projection from the ellipsoid to the plane such that all meridians have true length and uniform meridian scale. An example of the use of the rectifying latitude is the equidistant conic projection. (Snyder, Section 16). The rectifying latitude is also of great importance in the construction of the Transverse Mercator projection.

Authalic latitude

The authalic latitude (after the Greek for "same area"), gives an equal-area projection to a sphere.

where

and

and the radius of the sphere is taken as

An example of the use of the authalic latitude is the Albers equal-area conic projection.

Conformal latitude
The conformal latitude, gives an angle-preserving (conformal) transformation to the sphere.

where  is the Gudermannian function. (See also Mercator projection.)

The conformal latitude defines a transformation from the ellipsoid to a sphere of arbitrary radius such that the angle of intersection between any two lines on the ellipsoid is the same as the corresponding angle on the sphere (so that the shape of small elements is well preserved). A further conformal transformation from the sphere to the plane gives a conformal double projection from the ellipsoid to the plane. This is not the only way of generating such a conformal projection. For example, the 'exact' version of the Transverse Mercator projection on the ellipsoid is not a double projection. (It does, however, involve a generalisation of the conformal latitude to the complex plane).

Isometric latitude
The isometric latitude, is used in the development of the ellipsoidal versions of the normal Mercator projection and the Transverse Mercator projection. The graticule defined by the lines of constant  and constant , divides the surface of the ellipsoid into a mesh of squares (of varying size). The isometric latitude is zero at the equator but rapidly diverges from the geodetic latitude, tending to infinity at the poles. The conventional notation is given in Snyder (page 15):

The isometric latitude  is closely related to the conformal latitude :

Inverse formulae and series
The formulae in the previous sections give the auxiliary latitude in terms of the geodetic latitude. The expressions for the geocentric and parametric latitudes may be inverted directly but this is impossible in the four remaining cases: the rectifying, authalic, conformal, and isometric latitudes. There are two methods of proceeding.
 The first is a numerical inversion of the defining equation for each and every particular value of the auxiliary latitude. The methods available are fixed-point iteration and Newton–Raphson root finding.
 When converting from isometric or conformal to geodetic, two iterations of Newton-Raphson gives double precision accuracy.
 The other, more useful, approach is to express the auxiliary latitude as a series in terms of the geodetic latitude and then invert the series by the method of Lagrange reversion. Such series are presented by Adams who uses Taylor series expansions and gives coefficients in terms of the eccentricity. Osborne derives series to arbitrary order by using the computer algebra package Maxima and expresses the coefficients in terms of both eccentricity and flattening. The series method is not applicable to the isometric latitude and one must find the conformal latitude in an intermediate step.

Numerical comparison of auxiliary latitudes

The plot to the right shows the difference between the geodetic latitude and the auxiliary latitudes other than the isometric latitude (which diverges to infinity at the poles) for the case of the WGS84 ellipsoid. The differences shown on the plot are in arc minutes. 
In the Northern hemisphere (positive latitudes), θ ≤ χ ≤ μ ≤ ξ ≤ β ≤ ϕ; in the Southern hemisphere (negative latitudes), the inequalities are reversed, with equality at the equator and the poles. Although the graph appears symmetric about 45°, the minima of the curves actually lie between 45° 2′ and 45° 6′. Some representative data points are given in the table below. The conformal and geocentric latitudes are nearly indistinguishable, a fact that was exploited in the days of hand calculators to expedite the construction of map projections.

To first order in the flattening f, the auxiliary latitudes can be expressed as
ζ = ϕ − Cf sin 2ϕ
where the constant C takes on the values
[, 1, 1]
for
ζ = [β, ξ, μ, χ, θ].

Latitude and coordinate systems
The geodetic latitude, or any of the auxiliary latitudes defined on the reference ellipsoid, constitutes with longitude a two-dimensional coordinate system on that ellipsoid. To define the position of an arbitrary point it is necessary to extend such a coordinate system into three dimensions. Three latitudes are used in this way: the geodetic, geocentric and parametric latitudes are used in geodetic coordinates, spherical polar coordinates and ellipsoidal coordinates respectively.

Geodetic coordinates

At an arbitrary point  consider the line  which is normal to the reference ellipsoid. The geodetic coordinates  are the latitude and longitude of the point  on the ellipsoid and the distance . This height differs from the height above the geoid or a reference height such as that above mean sea level at a specified location. The direction of  will also differ from the direction of a vertical plumb line. The relation of these different heights requires knowledge of the shape of the geoid and also the gravity field of the Earth.

Spherical polar coordinates

Since the normal at a general point on the ellipsoid does not pass through the centre it is clear that points  on the normal, which all have the same geodetic latitude, will have differing geocentric latitudes. Spherical polar coordinate systems are used in the analysis of the gravity field.

Ellipsoidal-harmonic coordinates

The parametric latitude can also be extended to a three-dimensional coordinate system. For a point  not on the reference ellipsoid (semi-axes  and ) construct an auxiliary ellipsoid which is confocal (same foci) with the reference ellipsoid: the necessary condition is that the product  of semi-major axis and eccentricity is the same for both ellipsoids. Let  be the semi-minor axis of the auxiliary ellipsoid. The set  define the ellipsoidal-harmonic coordinates or simply ellipsoidal coordinates (although that term is also used to refer to geodetic coordinate). These coordinates are the natural choice in models of the gravity field for a rotating ellipsoidal body.
The above applies to a biaxial ellipsoid (a spheroid, as in oblate spheroidal coordinates); for a generalization, see triaxial ellipsoidal coordinates.

Coordinate conversions
The relations between the above coordinate systems, and also Cartesian coordinates are not presented here. The transformation between geodetic and Cartesian coordinates may be found in geographic coordinate conversion. The relation of Cartesian and spherical polars is given in spherical coordinate system. The relation of Cartesian and ellipsoidal coordinates is discussed in Torge.

Astronomical latitude

Astronomical latitude is the angle between the equatorial plane and the true vertical direction at a point on the surface. The true vertical, the direction of a plumb line, is also the gravity direction (the resultant of the gravitational acceleration (mass-based) and the centrifugal acceleration) at that latitude. Astronomic latitude is calculated from angles measured between the zenith and stars whose declination is accurately known.

In general the true vertical at a point on the surface does not exactly coincide with either the normal to the reference ellipsoid or the normal to the geoid. The geoid is an idealized, theoretical shape "at mean sea level". Points on land do not lie precisely on the geoid, and the vertical at a point at a specific time is influenced by tidal forces which the theoretical geoid averages out. The angle between the astronomic and geodetic normals is called vertical deflection and is usually a few seconds of arc but it is important in geodesy. 

Astronomical latitude is not to be confused with declination, the coordinate astronomers use in a similar way to specify the angular position of stars north/south of the celestial equator (see equatorial coordinates), nor with ecliptic latitude, the coordinate that astronomers use to specify the angular position of stars north/south of the ecliptic (see ecliptic coordinates).

See also

Altitude (mean sea level)
Bowditch's American Practical Navigator
Cardinal direction
Circle of latitude
Colatitude
Declination on celestial sphere
Degree Confluence Project
Geodesy
Geodetic datum
Geographic coordinate system
Geographical distance
Geomagnetic latitude
Geotagging
Great-circle distance
History of latitude
Horse latitudes
International Latitude Service
List of countries by latitude
Longitude
Natural Area Code
Navigation
Orders of magnitude (length)
World Geodetic System

References

Footnotes

Citations

External links

GEONets Names Server , access to the National Geospatial-Intelligence Agency's (NGA) database of foreign geographic feature names.
Resources for determining your latitude and longitude 
Convert decimal degrees into degrees, minutes, seconds - Info about decimal to sexagesimal conversion
Convert decimal degrees into degrees, minutes, seconds
Distance calculation based on latitude and longitude - JavaScript version
16th Century Latitude Survey
Determination of Latitude by Francis Drake on the Coast of California in 1579

 
Geodesy
Navigation